The 2000 Spanish Grand Prix (formally the XLII Gran Premio Marlboro de España) was a Formula One motor race held on 7 May 2000 at the Circuit de Catalunya, in Montmeló, Catalonia, Spain with approximately 79,000 spectators. It was the fifth round of the 2000 Formula One World Championship and the 42nd Spanish Grand Prix. McLaren driver Mika Häkkinen won the sixty-five lap race from second position. His teammate David Coulthard finished second, with Ferrari's Rubens Barrichello third.

Going into the event, Michael Schumacher led the World Drivers' Championship from Häkkinen and Ferrari led the World Constructors' Championship ahead of McLaren. He set the fastest lap in the qualifying session to start on pole position and held off Häkkinen on the first lap. Schumacher maintained the lead until his first pit stop on lap 24, when Ferrari chief mechanic Nigel Stepney was injured by Schumacher's right-rear tyre when Schumacher was mistakenly instructed to leave his box before the stop was completed. This promoted Häkkinen to the race lead, which he held until his pit stop two laps later. Michael Schumacher kept the lead for the next 22 laps as he and Häkkinen made their second pit stops together, with Häkkinen emerging in front after a refuelling error slowed Schumacher's pit stop. Häkkinen led the final 22 laps to achieve his first win of the season and the 15th of his career.

The race victory promoted Häkkinen to second place in the World Drivers' Championship, fourteen points behind Michael Schumacher. Coulthard's second-place finish saw him fall to third, and Barrichello's third place put him one point ahead of Ralf Schumacher. In the World Constructors' Championship, McLaren's one-two finish moved them to within seven points of leaders Ferrari. Williams remained in third with 15 points, with 12 races left in the season.

Background
The 2000 Spanish Grand Prix was the fifth of the seventeen races in the 2000 Formula One World Championship and was held at the  clockwise Circuit de Catalunya in Montmeló, Catalonia, Spain on 7 May 2000, following a two-week break from the preceding . For the Grand Prix, there were eleven teams (each representing a different constructor) of two drivers each, with no changes from the season entry list. Sole tyre supplier Bridgestone brought the soft and medium dry compound tyres to the event.

Before the race, Ferrari driver Michael Schumacher led the World Drivers' Championship with 34 points, ahead of McLaren teammates David Coulthard (14 points) and Mika Häkkinen (12 points). Ferrari's Rubens Barrichello and Williams' Ralf Schumacher were tied for fourth with nine points. Ferrari led the World Constructors' Championship with 43 points, 17 points ahead of McLaren in second. Williams were third with twelve points, and Benetton and Jordan with eight points each were both fourth.

Jos Verstappen was the fastest on the first day of testing for Arrows despite spinning into the gravel early in the session, ahead of McLaren test driver Olivier Panis. Michael Schumacher was the quickest on the second day. Michael Schumacher remained the fastest on testing's third day. The session was disrupted as several drivers stopped on the circuit with problems with their cars. On the final day, which was held in wet weather in the morning and during the end of the session, Michael Schumacher again remained quickest.

In the week before the race, Coulthard was leasing the Learjet of his friend David Murray when the aircraft developed engine trouble en route to Côte d'Azur International Airport in Nice and crashed while attempting an emergency landing at Lyon-Satolas Airport, France. Coulthard, his then-girlfriend American model Heidi Wichlinski and personal trainer/bodyguard Andy Matthews survived; Murray's personal pilot David Saunders and co-pilot Dan Worley died. Coulthard sustained bruises to his right rib cage and severe grazed elbows in the crash. FIA Formula One Safety and Medical Delegate Sid Watkins declared Coulthard fit to race. Coulthard's survival from the accident was the main focus of comment in the motorsport media before the Grand Prix.

British American Racing (BAR) driver Jacques Villeneuve was passed fit prior to the event. He was also required to undergo physiotherapy. BAR had their official test driver Darren Manning available to replace Villeneuve should the need arise.

Some teams modified their cars for the event. Most teams continued to refine the aerodynamic profiles of their vehicles, but did not introduce significant technical innovations at the Grand Prix. Minardi debuted the first titanium constructed gearbox in Formula One. This gearbox was  lighter than magnesium gearboxes and provided greater rigidity and was cost-effective. Prost modified their cars' oil system to improve the reliability of their engines, and made minor aerodynamic changes to the front wing and the floor. The team also used an updated Peugeot A20 EV2 engine during Friday's practice sessions, and reverted to the EV3 for the rest of the weekend. BAR fitted their cars with a revised aerodynamic package which included new bargeboards and rear wings. The Williams team fitted cast titanium hub carriers to their cars, but this was not used for the race since they affected the working of the brake vents.

Practice
There were four practice sessions preceding Sunday's race, two one-hour sessions on Friday and two 45-minute sessions on Saturday. Conditions were dry and overcast for the Friday practice sessions, but previous rainfall and undercard events made the track dirty, which stopped all but nine drivers from setting a time and seven tried to set a quick lap. The fastest laps were recorded late in practice. Michael Schumacher led with a lap of 1:21.982 at his second attempt to set a fast time. He was half a second quicker than his teammate Barrichello in second. Häkkinen was third, Ralf Schumacher fourth and Prost's Jean Alesi fifth. The two Benetton drivers were sixth and eighth, Giancarlo Fisichella ahead of Alexander Wurz; Sauber's Johnny Herbert was seventh. Jaguar's Eddie Irvine and Verstappen were ninth and tenth.

In the second practice session, Michael Schumacher was unable to lap faster but remained fastest; Ralf Schumacher set the second-fastest time with a new set of tyres towards the session's end. Barrichello was third-fastest, ahead of Jordan's Jarno Trulli, Coulthard and Williams' Jenson Button in positions four to six. Häkkinen, Pedro Diniz for Sauber, Heinz-Harald Frentzen for Jordan and Alesi followed in the top ten. Pedro de la Rosa lost control of his Arrows car under braking and got beached in the gravel trap, which briefly brought out the yellow flags. Fisichella spun 360 degrees backwards into the gravel trap at the Renault corner and had a second spin at the following right-hand turn.

The weather remained dry for the Saturday morning practice sessions. Coulthard set the third session's fastest lap of 1:21.370, ahead of teammate Häkkinen, who was two-tenths of a second slower; both drivers set their fastest times on a new set of tyres. Ralf Schumacher, Michael Schumacher, Villeneuve, Fisichella and Frentzen made up positions three to seven. The two Arrows drivers were eighth and ninth (with Verstappen ahead of De La Rosa) after setting identical lap times that topped the time sheets. Sauber's Mika Salo was tenth-fastest. There were no waved yellow flags during practice, although Frentzen briefly drove onto the grass late in the session.

During the final practice session, Michael Schumacher used a new set of tyres to set the fastest lap of 1:21.088; Coulthard was second-quickest. Barrichello was third fastest after being 14th in the preceding session. He lapped faster than Häkkinen, who experienced a lack of grip and a loose rear end. Ralf Schumacher recorded the fifth-quickest time. The Jordan drivers were sixth and seventh, Trulli in front of Frentzen, ahead of De La Rosa, Villeneuve and Button.

Qualifying

Saturday afternoon's one-hour qualifying session saw each driver limited to twelve laps, with the grid order decided by their fastest laps. During this session, the 107% rule was in effect, requiring each driver to remain within 107 per cent of the fastest lap time to qualify for the race. The session was held in sunny and hot weather. Michael Schumacher took his first pole position of the season and the 24th of his career, with a time of 1:20.974 set on a headwind-affected second run 43 minutes in. His time was more than a second quicker than the 1999 pole lap. Michael Schumacher was joined on the grid's front row by Häkkinen after being 0.076 seconds slower in the closing seconds of qualifying. Barrichello qualified third, and felt that his car did not feel good having not made any changes. Coulthard, fourth, lost time early in qualifying due to an engine fuel pressure pick-up issue. He decided not to drive his team's spare car set up for Häkkinen, believing it to be time-consuming, and he had to drive with extra fuel. Ralf Schumacher, fifth, had an excess oversteer that prevented him from lapping quicker. Villeneuve qualified sixth and said he achieved the best from his car. Both Jordan drivers lined up the fourth row of the grid (with Trulli ahead of Frentzen) and believed they could have a better starting position because of windy conditions.

De La Rosa and Irvine were ninth and tenth. Later in the day, a fuel sample from De La Rosa's car was analysed and declared illegal by the FIA in a mobile laboratory after it was not the same as an earlier sample. Arrows announced that it would appeal the decision, allowing de la Rosa to retain his starting position. Button, eleventh, reported crosswinds that made his car unstable. He was ahead of Verstappen in the slower Arrows car, Salo in the faster Sauber after losing time in the first third of the lap, and Fisichella, who could not lap quicker due to low track grip. Herbert, fifteenth, lost the television camera mounted to his front wing held on by a thin cable after hitting a kerb early in qualifying. He made a minor mistake which prevented him from qualifying higher. Diniz, 16th, had excess oversteer. Ricardo Zonta, seventeenth, was unable to find a suitable set-up for his BAR car and his fastest lap was nine-tenths of a second slower than teammate Villeneuve. Alesi qualified eighteenth and could not lap faster due to hydraulics problems and the circuit cooling. He was ahead of Wurz in nineteenth, who had grip and car setup issues. Heidfeld's engine failed on the circuit, and marshals extinguished a small fire when he returned to the pit lane. He drove the spare Prost vehicle setup for his teammate Alesi and qualified 20th. The two Minardi drivers Marc Gené and Gastón Mazzacane were 21st and 22nd.

Qualifying classification

Note:
  Pedro de la Rosa had started at the back of the grid for using illegal fuel in qualifying.

Warm-up
The drivers took to the track at 09:30 Central European Summer Time (UTC+2) for a 30-minute warm-up in cool and dry weather. Michael Schumacher set a lap of 1:22.855 to lead a session for the fifth time over the course of the race weekend despite going into the gravel after braking too deep, and also drove the spare Ferrari. Häkkinen was the second-fastest driver; Barrichello was third, and he was followed by Coulthard in fourth. De La Rosa ran into the gravel trap at Elf corner after his engine cut out; he returned to the pit lane to use the spare Arrows vehicle. Coulthard was launched airborne when he mounted the kerb at the final turn during a lap, but his vehicle sustained no damage. After the session concluded, Arrows withdrew their appeal after accepting the FIA's findings, and De La Rosa was required to start at the back of the field.

Race

A total of approximately 79,000 people attended the Grand Prix. Michael Schumacher and Häkkinen planned to make two pit stops over the course of the Grand Prix, with Schumacher, the only driver in the field, to select the medium compound tyres and not the soft compound tyres. Ralf Schumacher started the Grand Prix in the spare Williams vehicle because his race car developed an engine sensor issue the previous day. There was not an abundance of overtaking observed, which meant the outcome of the event was decided through pit stops.When the race started, Häkkinen got a better start than the slow starting Michael Schumacher, who steered right across the circuit to block Häkkinen's path on the outside. As a consequence of the manoeuvre, Häkkinen was unable to heavily challenge Michael Schumacher under braking for Elf corner. Ralf Schumacher made a swift getaway, passing Coulthard and the slow starting Barrichello to move into third. At the exit of the first right-hand turn, Ralf Schumacher made contact with the rear of Häkkinen's car which was on a large amount of dust, sending Häkkinen slightly sideways. Both drivers were able to continue, with Häkkinen ahead of Ralf Schumacher by being on the inside for the following left-hand turn. Button moved from eleventh to ninth by the end of the first lap, while Irvine fell three places over the same distance. Diniz spun into the gravel after driving onto dirt on the outside of turn three and retired. At the conclusion of lap one the top six in the race order were Michael Schumacher, Häkkinen, Ralf Schumacher, Coulthard, Barrichello and Villeneuve.
Michael Schumacher began to pull away from Häkkinen. De La Rosa ran into the rear of Alesi at Wurth corner on lap two, causing Alesi to retire. De La Rosa sustained a broken front wing and retired after beaching in the gravel trap at Campsa corner. Simultaneously, Irvine overtook Verstappen for twelfth position. The positions at the front were the same for the next sixteen laps with the gap between Michael Schumacher and the heavy-fuelled Häkkinen fluctuating from 1.6 seconds to 3.4 seconds due to driving through slower traffic while Coulthard and Barrichello battled Ralf Schumacher for third position. Green flag pit stops began on the 18th lap when three drivers made their stops. Button made his first pit stop on the following lap and rejoined in front of Mazzacane. Villeneuve made his only pit stop on the 22nd lap; Frentzen was promoted to sixth. After rejoining the circuit, his car caught fire after telemetry recorded a decrease in fuel pressure, and he pulled off to the side of the track at the exit of the long right-hand Renault corner. Trulli's pit stop, which dropped him to 17th, proved problematic: he stalled his engine, which required his mechanics to restart it. Ralf Schumacher made a pit stop one lap later and re-emerged in fifth.

On lap 24, Michael Schumacher made his pit stop. Mechanic Federico Ugozzoni raised the signboard before the fuel hose was removed from the Ferrari and Schumacher accelerated from his pit box. Two mechanics tried to remove the fuel hose that was lodged in the car's receptacle. This meant Schumacher's right rear wheel struck Ferrari's chief mechanic Nigel Stepney who was assisting the refueller. Stepney was dragged before being knocked over; he was taken to the circuit's medical center for observation, before a later X-ray examination in Paris found that he sustained a compound fracture of the tibia and stretched leg tendons. Stepney, who was replaced by reserve refuller Andrea Vacari, was ruled out for the following two . Coulthard made a pit stop on the same lap and experienced problems with leaving his pit box because he selected second gear. He re-emerged behind Ralf Schumacher. Häkkinen entered the pit lane for his first pit stop at the end of lap 26. He returned to the track behind Michael Schumacher. Verstappen retired in the pit lane with a gear selection fault on the next lap.All the leaders had made their stops by the start of lap 28. The top six in the running order were Michael Schumacher, Häkkinen, Ralf Schumacher, Barrichello, Coulthard and Button. Häkkinen set the race's fastest lap on the same lap, a 1:24.470 as he started to gain on Michael Schumacher. Ralf Schumacher again was pressured by Coulthard in fourth. Häkkinen did not attempt to overtake the race leader. Twelve laps later, Coulthard entered the pit lane for seven-and-a-half seconds in his attempt to pass Ralf Schumacher and Barrichello. This triggered the second round of pit stops for the front-runners. Ralf Schumacher and Barrichello made a pit stop on the following lap and rejoined behind Coulthard after being overtaken by Coulthard on the outside at Elf corner. Michael Schumacher and Häkkinen made their pit stops on the 42nd lap, with Häkkinen emerging ahead after a stop lasting 6.7 seconds because Michael Schumacher's pit stop was problematic. Michael Schumacher's mechanics had started refuelling due to Vacari having difficulty fitting the fuel pump into the fuel tank neck after Schumacher's tyres were installed. This meant Schumacher was stationary for ten seconds longer than usual. Salo and Zonta entered the pit lane on lap 45, promoting Button to sixth.

Coulthard closed up to Michael Schumacher (who was slowed by around 1.5 to 2 seconds per lap with air leaking from his left rear tyre) by lap 46. At the start of the following lap, Coulthard attempted to overtake Michael Schumacher on the inside on the pit lane straight into the first corner, intending to slow Schumacher at the right-hand turn. Schumacher steered right into Coulthard's path at the last possible moment as a blocking manoeuvre. The two drivers narrowly avoided a collision. Michael Schumacher's left-rear tyre slowed him at the last right-hand turn. Coulthard had better traction and steered to the outside on lap 48 to pass Michael Schumacher (who steered right to defending) by braking later into Elf corner. Ralf Schumacher drew close to Michael Schumacher on the 50th lap. Ralf Schumacher attempted to overtake Michael Schumacher on the outside on the same lap at La Caixa corner, but was blocked by his elder brother. Ralf Schumacher was forced wide and lost momentum, and pulled back into the following Banc Sabadell turn. This allowed Barrichello to pass the Schumacher brothers on the inside for third.

Michael Schumacher entered the pit lane on lap 51 for a new set of tyres. He remained fifth, ahead of Button, who was significantly behind Schumacher. He immediately set new personal fastest laps in an effort to catch Ralf Schumacher. However, the order was stable at the front of the field as Häkkinen had a significant lead over Coulthard, while Ralf Schumacher had dropped back from Barrichello. Button, sixth, retired at the side of the circuit on lap 63, with smoke billowing from his engine that failed without warning. Häkkinen maintained his lead to achieve his first victory of 2000 and the 15th of his Formula One career following the 1999 Japanese Grand Prix the previous season in a time of 1:33.55.390 at an average speed of  after 65 laps. Coulthard drove with three cracked right-hand side ribs to the eighth and tenth ribs, as well as a bruised right chest wall. He finished second, 16 seconds behind his teammate. Barrichello was third, with Ralf Schumacher fourth, Michael Schumacher fifth and Frentzen was the final points-scorer in sixth. Salo, Zonta, Fisichella, Wurz and Irvine were the next five finishers, and Trulli, Herbert, Gené (who lacked fuel in his car), Mazzacane, Heidfeld and Button (despite his retirement) were the final classified finishers.

Post-race

The top three drivers appeared on the podium to collect their trophies and in a later press conference. Häkkinen said that he was "pleased" to win the race, and admitted to waiting until the pit stop phase to have any chance of overtaking Michael Schumacher. He said that McLaren had more work to do on his car and was looking forward to the next race. Coulthard believed he made the right decision to compete in the Grand Prix despite his injuries, and that the result was "the best thing that could have happened for the team and myself." He also said he was looking forward to resting over the coming days to allow his injuries to heal. Barrichello admitted that the race had not been good for him until his overtake on Michael Schumacher and Ralf Schumacher, and said the absence of Stepney caused his second pit stop to be slower than usual.

Attention focused on the battle between Ralf Schumacher and Michael Schumacher during the race. Michael Schumacher blamed his brother for instigating the move and did not understand why he was upset over the incident. Ralf Schumacher did not comment and stated that he would watch a video of the incident before commenting. Their father, Rolf, talked to the two brothers to try to reconcile the two drivers. One week after the race, Ralf Schumacher said that tensions between him and his brother had eased and that there was no resentment towards each other, saying, "It's a lot of fun when we are out there on the track duelling against each other." There was similar ill-feeling between de la Rosa and Alesi after their collision on lap two. de la Rosa accused Alesi of blocking him, and of causing the crash by not looking in his mirrors, while Alesi said de la Rosa attempted to overtake him in a corner where overtaking is difficult.

Ron Dennis, the McLaren team owner, called it "very good outcome" and was pleased with the strategy of the entire McLaren team, saying: "It's a great day, particularly satisfying not only when you think of the pressure that's unique to catching up, but also the circumstances of the week, with David's accident." Ferrari team principal Jean Todt admitted that his team were disappointed with their result in the Grand Prix, but added: "However, we have always known that even a big advantage can easily be reduced. It was a good fight between Michael and Hakkinen, at least up to the second pitstop." Following the race, Michael Schumacher apologised to Stepney for injuring him.

As a consequence of the final Grand Prix results, Häkkinen moved from third to second in the World Drivers' Championship, reducing Michael Schumacher's lead from 20 to 14 points. Coulthard's second-place finish saw him demoted from second to third, two points behind Häkkinen. Barrichello moved into fourth on 13 points, and Ralf Schumacher fell to fifth with 12 points. Ferrari maintained their World Constructors' Championship lead, but McLaren's one-two finish moved to within seven points behind. Williams maintained third position with nine points. Frentzen's sixth-place finish allowed Jordan in fourth to move one point ahead of Benetton in fifth, with twelve races remaining in the season.

Race classification
Drivers who scored championship points are denoted in bold.

Championship standings after the race 

Drivers' Championship standings

Constructors' Championship standings

 Note: Only the top five positions are included for both sets of standings.

References

Spanish Grand Prix
Grand Prix
Spanish Grand Prix
Spanish Grand Prix